p-Azobenzenearsonate is an arsenical.   It causes antibody formation and delayed hypersensitivity when bound to aromatic amino acids, polypeptides or proteins.  It is used as an immunologic research tool.

References

Azo compounds
Arsonic acids